Aro is a Finnish surname. Notable people with the surname include:

Elizabeth Aro, Argentinean artist
Johan Emil Aro (1874–1928), Finnish entomologist
Jori Aro, Finnish curler
Markku Aro (born 1950), Finnish singer
Samuli Aro (born 1975), Finnish enduro rider
Toivo Aro (1887–1962), Finnish diver

Finnish-language surnames